Saskatoon Greystone was a provincial electoral district for the Legislative Assembly of Saskatchewan, Canada. It was last contested in the 2011 provincial election before being dissolved into Saskatoon Churchill-Wildwood and Saskatoon University.

The district encompassed the Greystone Heights, Grosvenor Park, Brevoort Park and Wildwood neighbourhoods of Saskatoon.

Members of the Legislative Assembly

Election results

|-

 
|NDP
|Peter Prebble
|align="right"|3,174
|align="right"|37.94
|align="right"|-0.87

|- bgcolor="white"
!align="left" colspan=3|Total
!align="right"|8,366
!align="right"|100.00
!align="right"|

|-

 
|NDP
|Andrew Mason
|align="right"|3,732
|align="right"|38.81
|align="right"|-10.28

|- bgcolor="white"
!align="left" colspan=3|Total
!align="right"|9,615
!align="right"|100.00
!align="right"|

|-
 
| style="width: 130px" |NDP
|Peter Prebble
|align="right"|4,287
|align="right"|49.09
|align="right"|+1.23

|- bgcolor="white"
!align="left" colspan=3|Total
!align="right"|8,733
!align="right"|100.00
!align="right"|

|-
 
| style="width: 130px" |NDP
|Peter Prebble
|align="right"|3,630
|align="right"|47.86
|align="right"|+4.78

|- bgcolor="white"
!align="left" colspan=3|Total
!align="right"|7,585
!align="right"|100.00
!align="right"|

|-

|NDP
|Marjory Gammel
|align="right"|3,519
|align="right"|43.08
|align="right"|+5.14

|Prog. Conservative
|Gary Hellard
|align="right"|636
|align="right"|7.79
|align="right"|-2.56
|- bgcolor="white"
!align="left" colspan=3|Total
!align="right"|8,168
!align="right"|100.00
!align="right"|

|-

|NDP
|Peter Prebble
|align="right"|4,009
|align="right"|37.94
|align="right"|*

|Prog. Conservative
|Gary Hellard
|align="right"|1,094
|align="right"|10.35
|align="right"|*
}
|Independent
|Leslie Cushion
|align="right"|40
|align="right"|0.39
|align="right"|*
|- bgcolor="white"
!align="left" colspan=3|Total
!align="right"|10,565
!align="right"|100.00
!align="right"|

External links 
Website of the Legislative Assembly of Saskatchewan
Elections Saskatchewan: Official Results of the 2007 Provincial Election By Electoral Division
Elections Saskatchewan - Official Results of the 2011 Provincial Election
Saskatchewan Archives Board – Saskatchewan Election Results By Electoral Division

Former provincial electoral districts of Saskatchewan
Politics of Saskatoon